USS Rescue is a name used more than once by the U.S. Navy:

 , was on loan to the U.S. Government by Henry Grinnell in 1850 for use in tracing the ill-fated May 1845 Arctic expedition.
 , purchased for the Navy on 21 August 1861; fitted out at Philadelphia, Pennsylvania and ordered to join the Potomac Flotilla.
 , a salvage tug commissioned 25 September 1918.

United States Navy ship names